Tarcísio Gomes de Freitas (born 19 June 1975) is a Brazilian engineer and politician who has served as Governor of São Paulo since 1 January 2023. A member of the Republicanos party, Freitas served Minister of Infrastructure under President Jair Bolsonaro from 1 January 2019 to 31 March 2022.

Freitas resigned from office in order to run for Governor of São Paulo in the 2022 election. In the October 2022 run-off Tarcísio defeated PT candidate Fernando Haddad, becoming the first elected governor of São Paulo in 28 years to not be a PSDB member.

Background and education
Freitas was born in Rio de Janeiro.

A government employee linked to the legislative consultancy body of the Chamber of Deputies, Freitas is a graduate of Agulhas Negras Military Academy and also graduated in engineering at the Military Institute of Engineering, where he scored the highest average grade in the institution.

Gomes served as engineer for the Brazilian Army, chief of the technical section of the Engineering Company of Brazil at United Nations Stabilisation Mission in Haiti (MINUSTAH), and auditing coordinator in the Transportation Division of the Comptroller General of Brazil (CGU).

In 2011, he was appointed executive director of the National Department of the Infrastructure of Transportation (DNIT) by General Jorge Fraxe, who led the office during the "ethical cleaning" ordered by then-president Dilma Rousseff, after a crisis caused by corruption allegations. He ascended to the directory-general in 2014.

In 2015, he acted as secretary of the Coordination of Projects of the Special Secretariat of the Program of Partnerships of Investments (PPI), responsible for the program of privatizations and concessions.

Governor of São Paulo 

Prior to announcing his candidacy for Governor of São Paulo in the 2022 election, he was speculated to run for Federal Senate to represent Brasília. Following his victory in the 2022 gubernatorial election, commentators have suggested that he may run for President in the 2026 Brazilian general election.

Personal life

Freitas is Roman Catholic.

Notes

References

External links
 

|-

1975 births
Living people
People from Rio de Janeiro (city)
Brazilian Roman Catholics
Brazilian civil engineers
Government ministers of Brazil
Republicans (Brazil) politicians